Tirupati is a city in Tirupati district of the Indian state of Andhra Pradesh. It is a municipal corporation and the headquarters of Tirupati district, and of the Tirupati revenue division.

Tirupati is home for famous Vaishnavite shrine Venkateswara Temple and many other Hindu temples.

List

Nearby Temples

Srikalahasti Temple

Srikalahasti Temple is a 5th-century temple of Lord Shiva, as Kalahastiswara, situated on the banks of the River Swarnamukhi. The renowned devotee of Lord Shiva, Kannappa, attained salvation there. It is famous for its Vayu linga, one of the Panchabhoota Sthalams, representing wind. The temple is also associated with Rahu and Kethu (of the nine grahams or celestial bodies in the Indian astrological scheme).

Kanipakam Temple

Vinayaka Temple or Sri Varasidhi Vinayaka Swamy Temple is a Hindu temple of Ganesha. It is located at Kanipakam in Chittoor district of Andhra Pradesh, India.[1] The temple is about 11 km from Chittoor and 68 km from Tirupati.

See also 
Temples of Andhra Pradesh

References 

Buildings and structures in Tirupati
Tirupati
Lists of tourist attractions in Andhra Pradesh